Acetivibrio clariflavus is an anaerobic bacterium from the genus Acetivibrio which has been isolated from sludge from a cellulose-degrading bioreactor in Japan.

References

Further reading
 

 

Bacteria described in 2009
Oscillospiraceae